Clash of Codes is a term in sports used to describe a match played between two teams who play different codes of the same sport. Games are usually played with the codes changing at half-time, or across two matches of the difference codes with an aggregate score.

Usually associated with the codes of football, and especially rugby, several games have occurred throughout history.

American Football vs Rugby League

Jacksonville Axemen vs Jacksonville Knights

The first clash of Codes match between American football and rugby league was played between Jacksonville Axemen and Jacksonville Knights. The league side Axemen defeated the American football side Knights 38–27.

Rugby League vs Rugby Union

Kangaroos vs Wallabies
In September 1909 the national league and union sides of Australia played a four match test series resulting in two wins a piece for either side. The exact format and rules of the game are unknown. All games were played at the Agricultural Oval in Sydney.

Bath vs Wigan

The first clash of codes game in the UK between rugby league and rugby union received a lot of media attention and was labelled as The Clash of the Codes. The game was between Bath and Wigan and saw league side Wigan win with an aggregate score of 101–50 across two games.

St Helens vs Sale Sharks

In January 2003, St. Helens took on Sale Sharks in a single game played at Knowsley Road, which had one half under league rules and the other under union rules. At the time Sale had the been a  professional side for almost a decade which helped improve both strength and fitness that was necessary for them to adapt to the constant tackling required in rugby league, as well as being able to call on the services of a number of ex-league players, most notably Jason Robinson, who had played for Wigan in 1996, factors which were though to have resulted in a much closer game compared to that of Bath vs Wigan. Having built up a 41–0 lead under union rules, St Helens were restricted to only 39 points under league rules.

Salford Red Devils vs Sale Sharks
In February 2014, eleven years after the first dual code single game, it was announced that the AJ Bell Stadium would see another fixture, scheduled for 26 August 2014, between the facility's two tenants, Salford Red Devils and Sale Sharks, to raise money for various charities. However, in July the same year it was subsequently announced that the game was being postponed owing to the difficulties of the two clubs' respective league schedules - the original date was between two important fixtures towards the end of Salford's league season, while Sale had yet to start their own league season.

Western Suburbs vs Randwick
In October 2015, Western Suburbs Magpies played Randwick DRUFC in Australia's first Clash of Codes games of domestic teams in what was described as "hybrid rugby". The game was 13-a-side and featured league rules when in the teams own half and union rules when in the opposition half, as well as 60 second transitions. The league side won 47–19, with union points for tries, and league sides for conversions, penalties, and drop goals.

See also
 International rules football – a hybrid code of football combining elements of Australian rules football and Gaelic football

References

Sports terminology
Salford Red Devils
Sale Sharks
St Helens R.F.C.
Western Suburbs Magpies